In mathematics, Bloch function may refer to:

Named after Swiss physicist Felix Bloch
 a periodic function which appears in the solution of the Schrödinger equation with periodic potential; see Bloch's theorem.
Named after French mathematician André Bloch
 an analytic function in the unit disc which is an element of the Bloch space.